Ballyskenagh GAA is a Gaelic Athletic Association club located in Ballyskenagh, County Offaly, Ireland. The club is almost exclusively concerned with the game of hurling.

Achievements
 Offaly Intermediate Hurling Championship (3) 1979, 1995, 2008
 Offaly Junior A Hurling Championship (3) 1961, 1977, 1994

Notable players
 Pat Cleary
 David Franks
 Paddy Kirwan
 Brendan Murphy

References

External links
 Ballyskenagh GAA on Facebook

Gaelic games clubs in County Offaly
Hurling clubs in County Offaly